Kojo Obed Amoako-Prempeh was a Ghanaian public servant and politician. He was the member of parliament for the Akan Wawa constituency from 9 June 1965 to February 1966 when the Nkrumah government was overthrown. At the inception of the third republic, he was elected as the member of parliament for the Akan constituency on the ticket of the People's National Party. He served in this capacity from 1979 to 1981. Prior to politics, he was the Volta Region regional loans officer for the Cocoa Marketing Board.

See also
 List of MPs elected in the 1965 Ghanaian parliamentary election

References

20th-century Ghanaian politicians
Ghanaian MPs 1965–1966
Ghanaian MPs 1979–1981
Year of birth missing
Possibly living people
Gold Coast (British colony) people
People from Volta Region